Hidden Treasures (Traditional Chinese: 翻新大少 or also known as 鴨寮街的金蛋) is a TVB modern drama series released overseas in May 2004 and broadcast on TVB Jade Channel in September 2005.

The series takes place in the famous Hong Kong electronics street, Apliu Street.

Cast

Viewership ratings

References

External links
TVB.com Hidden Treasures - Official Website 

TVB dramas
2005 Hong Kong television series debuts
2005 Hong Kong television series endings